R319 road may refer to:
 R319 road (Ireland)
 R319 road (South Africa)